Erik Foersom Gaardhøje (2 November 1938 – 22 May 2007) was a Danish footballer who played as a goalkeeper for Esbjerg fB. He made fourteen appearances for the Denmark national team from 1961 to 1963. He was also part of Denmark's squad at the 1960 Summer Olympics, but he did not play in any matches.

References

External links
 

1938 births
2007 deaths
People from Frederikshavn
Danish men's footballers
Association football goalkeepers
Denmark international footballers
Olympic footballers of Denmark
Footballers at the 1960 Summer Olympics
Esbjerg fB players
Sportspeople from the North Jutland Region